Ann Christophersen was one of the owners of Chicago’s Women & Children First bookstore.  As of 2011, it was the largest feminist bookstore in the United States.  Together with Linda Bubon, they opened the store in 1979.

She served on the board of directors of the American Booksellers Association for six years and served as President.  She became President in 2002.  During her tenure at the ABA, she supported their efforts to help independent bookstores including some publishers for violating antitrust laws.

In 2014, the store was sold to two staff members.

Awards and Honors
Christophersen was inducted into the Chicago LGBT Hall of Fame in 1992. In April 2004,  Chicago Sun-Times named her one of the 100 most powerful women in Chicago.

References

Year of birth missing (living people)
Living people
Businesspeople from Chicago
American booksellers
20th-century American businesswomen
20th-century American businesspeople
American LGBT businesspeople
Inductees of the Chicago LGBT Hall of Fame